Nico van Est (19 April 1928 – 8 July 2009) was a Dutch racing cyclist. He rode in the 1954 Tour de France.

References

1928 births
2009 deaths
Dutch male cyclists
Place of birth missing